Ktsord or Ktsourd (Armenian "attachment") is the most ancient type of Armenian religious song.

It received its name from being "attached" to biblical psalms and blessings. They have been sung since 4th-5th centuries, and until the invention of the Armenian alphabet it was communicated orally. The first ktsords were generally short songs composed of three verses.

References
 Grigor Suni, Armenian music, Yerevan, 2005, p. 102-103, 

Armenian music